Henderson's Relish is a condiment produced in Sheffield in South Yorkshire, England. It is similar in appearance to Worcestershire sauce, but contains no anchovies. It is made of water, sugar and spirit vinegar with a selection of spices and colouring. It is gluten free, suitable for vegans and is approved by the Vegetarian Society.

Henry Henderson began manufacturing sauce in the latter part of the 19th century. Originally manufactured at 35 Broad Lane in Sheffield, Henderson's Relish is still being made and was in uninterrupted production within half a mile of the site from which the first bottle was filled, until the move to a new factory in 2013. In 1910, the company was bought by Shaws of Huddersfield, who still supply Hendersons with vinegar. In 1940, Charles Hinksman formed the present company of Hendersons (Sheffield) Ltd., the control of which has remained with the family.

It is widely known in Sheffield as "Hendo's".

Ingredients 
Henderson's has a base of spirit vinegar and acetic acid, coloured with caramel and sweetened with sugar and saccharin. Its flavour is derived from tamarind, cayenne pepper and garlic oil. Henderson's use of cloves distinguishes it from other English sauces.

It is distinguished from other sauces in that it does not use anchovies as an ingredient.

Local following
According to Hendersons, famous fans of the condiment include Sheffield-born celebrities Sean Bean, Def Leppard's Rick Savage, Millie Bright and Peter Stringfellow. Politician David Blunkett, also a Sheffield native, used it when he cooked shepherd's pie on chef Gordon Ramsay's The F Word TV cookery programme.

In 1993, two special-edition labels were produced to celebrate the FA Cup semi-final.  Sheffield's two league clubs, Sheffield United and Sheffield Wednesday, both then in the Premier League, contested the match at Wembley.  The bottles were produced with labels in both red and white stripes (United's colours) and blue and white stripes (Wednesday's colours). These labels are still available in the respective clubs' shops.

The singer/songwriter Richard Hawley used specially-labelled bottles of Henderson's Relish to promote his 2005 album Coles Corner. On his 2007 autumn tour, special bottles of the relish were available to promote his then-current album Lady's Bridge.

The Sheffield band The Everly Pregnant Brothers have a song called "Hendos", a pastiche of the Coldplay song "Yellow" and also name-check the product in their song "No Oven No Pie", a pastiche of "No Woman, No Cry" by Bob Marley and the Wailers. They also mention it in their version of "Imagine".

The comedian Tom Wrigglesworth said of Henderson's Relish that while outsiders think the condiment is Sheffield's answer to Worcestershire sauce, Sheffielders think it is the answer to everything.

Henderson's Relish has been an inspiration to several artists from Sheffield, such as Rick Savage (Def Leppard), who have produced pieces about the product. Pete McKee, Kid Acne and Jim Connolly have all released prints offering their own unique take on the relish. It also featured in the plotline of the second episode of Series 4 of BBC Radio 4's comedy series Tom Wrigglesworth's Hang-Ups in September 2016.

A gold-label version was produced to commemorate Jessica Ennis winning the Heptathlon at the 2012 Olympics.

Hendogate 
Knowledge of Henderson's is so limited outside Yorkshire that, in February 2014, Lewisham MP Jim Dowd misunderstood it as a copy of the anchovy-based Lea and Perrins and described it as "parasitic packaging" in an attempt to pass off one sauce as another, during a parliamentary debate on the Intellectual Property Bill. He had encountered the sauce at a pub in Blackheath, the Hare and Billet, also far outside the usual Henderson's region. Later, he was corrected by comments from Sheffield MPs Paul Blomfield and Nick Clegg. Dowd later toured the Henderson's factory in a peace-making gesture.

Factory 

After starting in Sheffield over one hundred years ago, until 2013 the relish was in uninterrupted production within half a mile of the original site on Broad Lane from which the first bottle was filled. The Henderson's factory was located opposite what was once the Jessop Hospital for Women, now the Music Department of the University of Sheffield. The building is adjacent to the University of Sheffield Supertram stop, on Leavygreave Road. In September 2008, the sign that had adorned the side of the historic Henderson's Relish building was stolen, and shortly afterwards was placed for sale on a local Sheffield blog.

In 2013, the manufacturer moved to Sheffield Parkway Business Park.

Sheffield University plans to preserve and redevelop the original building as part of its campus.

See also

 Lea & Perrins
Steak sauce
A.1. Sauce
Worcestershire sauce

Notes

References

External links 
Official website

British condiments
Brand name condiments
Economy of Sheffield
Yorkshire cuisine
Vegan cuisine